Lullaby for Liquid Pig is an album by alternative rock artist Lisa Germano. It was released in 2003 on the ARTISTdirect imprints iMusic and Ineffable Records, and re-released in 2007 on Young God Records. Lullaby for Liquid Pig is her first studio album since 1998's Slide. Some versions included a bonus disc of live and home-recorded material.

Track listing
All tracks composed by Lisa Germano
 "Nobody's Playing"
 "Paper Doll"
 "Liquid Pig"
 "Pearls"
 "Candy"
 "Dream Glasses Off"
 "From a Shell"
 "It's Party Time"
 "All the Pretty Lies"
 "Lullaby for Liquid Pig"
 "Into the Night"
 "....to Dream"

Personnel
Craig Ross, Johnny Marr – guitar
Sebastian Steinberg – bass
Neil Finn – keyboards
Butch Norton, Joey Waronker, Wendy Melvoin – drums

References

Lisa Germano albums
2003 albums